Solar power in the Netherlands has an installed capacity of around 18,849 megawatt (MW) of photovoltaics as of the end of 2021. Around 3,938 MW of new capacity was installed during 2022.

Timeline 
2008 Subsidies of 33 euro cents per kWh were introduced but initially failed to attract much development, but when they were curtailed, the Dutch banded together to make large purchases at discount instead.

2011 A 500-kilowatt solar array was added to the roof of Rotterdam's central train station.

2012 Solar capacity more than doubled to 321 MW with new added capacity of 175 MW.

2013 According to the Dutch grid operators, solar capacity grew to a cumulative power of 655.4 MW at the end of 2013 

2014  By August 2014, the total had reached 1 GW mark for the first time.

2015 The Netherlands saw its capacity grow by around 357 MW during 2015, the fourth highest in Europe in that year, its installed capacity per inhabitant remained low at 83.1 Watts per inhabitant compared to the European average of 186.1 Wp/inhab, in particular compared to its neighbour Belgium at 286.7 Wp/inhab.

2016 The largest solar installation in the Netherlands, the 6 MW array at the Wadden-Island Ameland was officially opened in June 2016. Installed capacity per capita rose to 120.1 W, thirteenth position in the EU and nearer to the EU average of 197.8 W than in preceding years.

2019 The largest solar installation in the Netherlands, the 103 MWp array in Groningen, becomes operational.

2020 The Netherlands passed the 10.000 MWp of installed PV capacity, becoming the 10th country to pass the 10 GW barrier.

2022 A new solar carport measuring 1 kilometer by 500 meters opened in Flevoland. The 90.000 solar panels with 35 MWp will power 10.000 households.

Statistics 

Deployment of photovoltaic systems in the Netherlands. Nameplate capacity in MWP.

In addition to photovoltaics, solar energy is used extensively for heating water, with 669.313 m2 installed by the end of 2020. Generating a total of 326 GWh heat energy in 2020.

Solar PV market by segment 

Nearly 80% of solar power installed in the Netherlands in 2017 was for small systems of less than 10 kW, a large part being rooftop Solar PV. Larger systems over 500 kW accounted for just 6.9% of the total. By the end of 2018 private residential rooftop systems had an installed capacity of 2,307 MW,  businesses rooftop systems 1,662 MW whilst solar parks amounted to 444 MW.

Residential Solar PV Capacity 

According to a report on behalf of the European Commission in 2015 the Netherlands had an estimated 1,086 MW of residential solar PV capacity  with 232,000 residential solar PV prosumers in the country representing 3% of households. The average size of residential solar PV systems is estimated to be 4.69 kW moving to 2030. The technical potential for residential solar PV in the Netherlands is estimated at 13,945 MW. The payback time for residential Solar PV in the Netherlands is 9.7 years as of 2015. Some of the advantages of small scale residential Solar include eliminating the need for extra land, keeping cost saving advantages in local communities and empowering households to become prosumers of renewable electricity and thus raising awareness of wasteful consumption habits and environmental issues through direct experience. By 2018 residential Solar PV had more than doubled to 2,307 MW. In 2021 over 1.5 million households (19% of households) have solar rooftop systems installed.

Solar roads 

In November 2014 SolaRoad, the world's first experimental solar cycle path, was opened in the village of Krommenie. The aim of the project is to test the practicality and cost efficiency of embedding solar panels into a cycle path. The idea is that the path, which is expected to generate 50 to 70 kWh/m2 each year, can power anything from street lights or traffic lights to electric cars or houses. The developers of SolaRoad believe that up to 20% of the 140,000 km of road in the Netherlands could be used to harvest solar energy.

In 2017 solar panels were installed in a cycle path in Blauwestad.

In April 2017 the first heated solar cycle path was installed in the Bovenbuurtweg in Ede. The panels would stay free of snow and ice during the winter. In February 2020 the solar panels were replaced with panels with a different surface coating to make the cycle path less slippery.

In May 2018 a 20 meter long solar road with 48 solar panels opened on the N401 near Kockengen. The trial was supposed to last 2 years, but was stopped a year earlier on 16 May 2019 because of safety concerns. The rough surface had worn down and had become too slippery to safely drive on. In that time the solar road geretated around 2,200 kWh of electricity. The trial was seen as a success.

In May 2018 a 10 meter long and 3.5 meter wide solar cycle path was built in Haaksbergen.

In September 2018 solar panels were installed in the road surface of one of the shoulder lanes of the A2 motorway near Maarssen. The solar panels cover an area of 25 square meters.

On 7 March 2019 a 2-year pilot project with a 100 meter long solar bus lane opened on the N218 in Spijkenisse. The solar road was supposed to generate 30,000 kWh per year. Enough to supply electricity to around 9 households. One week after opening damage was found to the top layer of the solar road and the bus lane was closed for traffic. Investigation found that the solar panel and top layer had detached from the underlying concrete and repair would not be possible. In July 2019 the province of South Holland made the decision to discontinue the pilot and the solar road was removed.

Another pilot project opened on 7 March 2019 with a 50 meter long solar road on the N232 in near Schiphol. This solar road suffered from the same problems as the one in Spijkenisse. The road was closed on 13 March 2019.

In May 2019 the new Boekelose bridge with solar panels in the road surface opened in Hengelo. In January 2020 a new coating layer was applied because the original coating had worn away and the panels had become too slippery for motorcycles to safely drive on.

In May 2019 solar panels were installed in the cycle path next to the N324 in Grave.

In February 2020 solar panels were installed in a cycle path on the Westerweg near Den Burg, Texel. The panels cover an area of 10 square meters.

In February 2020 a 25 meter long solar cycle path was installed next to the N225 in Rhenen.

In 2021 a 60 square meter solar road for testing different kind of solar panels was opened at the Chemelot Campus in Geleen.

On 14 July 2021 a 330 meter long solar cycle path opened next to the N417 in Maartensdijk. It was the longest solar cycle path in the world when it opened. The cycle path consists of 120 modules. Initially it was estimated that the cycle path would produce about 137,000 kWh per year, which is enough electricity for around 40 households. However, due to construction errors only half of the panels are properly connected and thus the actual generated electricity is a lot lower than originally estimated. The connections are buried within the concrete, thus making it hard to repair.

A 400 meter long solar cycle path is planned next to the N232 near Schiphol. Another 400 meter long cycle path is planned next to the N285 in Wagenberg. Both cycle paths are planned to open in 2023 and will be monitored for 5 years.

Large scale solar parks

Floating solar parks

Gallery

See also

Solar power in the European Union
Wind power in the Netherlands
Hydroelectric power in the Netherlands
Renewable energy in the Netherlands

Notes

References

 

 
Netherlands